Carol Kelso (born May 26, 1945) is an American politician who served as a member of the Wisconsin State Assembly from 1995 to 2001.

Early life and education
Kelso was born on May 26, 1945 in Fort Smith, Arkansas. She graduated from Iowa City High School in Iowa City, Iowa and earned a Bachelor of Science degree from Iowa State University.

Career 
After graduating from college, Kelso moved to Green Bay, Wisconsin. Kelso became active in the Green Bay Area Chamber of Commerce and served as the public information coordinator of the Green Bay Metropolitan Sewerage District starting in 1989.

Kelso was first elected to the Wisconsin State Assembly in 1994 and served until 2001. She later served as Executive of Brown County, Wisconsin from 2002 to 2007. Kelso is a Republican.

Since retiring from politics, Kelso has retired to Maricopa County, Arizona. In 2020, she authored two letters to the editor published in The Fountain Hills Times.

Personal life 
Kelso is married and has two children.

References

Politicians from Fort Smith, Arkansas
Politicians from Iowa City, Iowa
Politicians from Green Bay, Wisconsin
Republican Party members of the Wisconsin State Assembly
County executives in Wisconsin
Women state legislators in Wisconsin
Iowa State University alumni
1945 births
Living people
Iowa City High School alumni
21st-century American women